Gangapur Assembly constituency may refer to 
 Gangapur, Maharashtra Assembly constituency
 Gangapur, Rajasthan Assembly constituency